The R330 is a Regional Route in South Africa that connects Cape St. Francis on the south coast with Hankey to the north via Humansdorp.

Route

Its northern origin is an intersection with the R331 at Hankey. The route heads south-south-west. Just before reaching the N2 it meets the southern origin of the R332. Crossing the N2, it reaches Humansdorp, where it meets the R102 at a staggered interchange. It then heads south, past St. Francis Bay to end at the village of Cape St. Francis.

External links
 Routes Travel Info

References

Regional Routes in the Eastern Cape